Dr. Yvo G. Desmedt (born 1956) is the Jonsson Distinguished Professor at the University of Texas at Dallas, and in addition Chair of Information Communication Technology at University College London.  He was a pioneer of threshold cryptography and is an International Association for Cryptologic Research Fellow.  He also made crucial observations  that were used in the cryptanalysis of the Merkle–Hellman knapsack cryptosystem and observed properties of the Data Encryption Standard which were used by Eli Biham and Adi Shamir when they invented Differential Cryptanalysis.

Education 
Desmedt received his M.Sc in Electrical Engineering from the University of Leuven, Belgium in 1979. He received his Ph.D. from the University of Leuven, Belgium in 1984.

Career 
Dr. Yvo Desmedt has been the Jonsson Distinguished Professor in the Department of Computer Science at The University of Texas at Dallas, USA since August 2012. In addition he is also been Chair of Information Communication Technology in the Department of Computer Science at University College London, since August 2004.

His other professional activities include
 Member of Cyber Security Research and Education Institute. 
 Editor in Chief IET Information Security Journal
 Chair of the Steering Committee of:
 International Conference on Cryptology and Network Security
 International Conference on Information Theoretic Security
 Member of the Steering Committee of the International Workshop on Practice and Theory in Public Key Cryptography (PKC)
He has been active in research for over 30 years mainly in the field of cryptography, network security, critical infrastructure and computer security. His work has resulted in 29 peer-reviewed journal articles, 138 conference and workshop papers, 5 editorships, 25 reference works and 19 informal publications

Awards and honors 
 100 Year Bell Telephone Belgium Prize, 1983
 IBM Belgium Prize for best PhD in Computer Science, 1985
 S.W.I.F.T. (Society for Worldwide Interbank Financial Telecommunication) Prize, 1985
 Center of Excellence in Information Security Education at Florida State University, 2000
 International Association of Cryptologic Research Fellow, 2010

References

External links 
 Dr. Yvo Desmedt's University College London homepage
 Dr. Yvo Desmedt's University of Texas at Dallas home page
 Dr. Yvo Desmedt 2010 IACR Fellow

Modern cryptographers
Living people
International Association for Cryptologic Research fellows
1956 births

Belgian cryptographers